Revidere (foaled in 1973 in Kentucky) was an American Thoroughbred racehorse that was voted the 1976 Eclipse Award as the American Champion Three-Year-Old Filly.Her sire was Reviewer, who is best known as the sire of champion filly Ruffian. Her dam was Quillesian.

In her championship year on 9 October 1976, Revidere won the inaugural Ruffian Stakes defeating the Argentine bred Bastonera II by 14 lengths.

Retired to serve as a broodmare, Revidere was bred to stallions such as Hoist The Flag, Lyphard, Alydar, Alleged, Slew o' Gold, and owner William Haggin Perry's Belmont Stakes winner,  Coastal.

References

 Revidere's pedigree and partial racing stats

1973 racehorse births
Racehorses bred in Kentucky
Racehorses trained in the United States
Eclipse Award winners
Thoroughbred family 4-m